"Hey Girl" is a song by American contemporary Christian music singer Anne Wilson. It was released to Christian radio in the United States on September 16, 2022, as the third single from her debut studio album, My Jesus (2022). Wilson co-wrote the song with Jeff Pardo and Matthew West.

"Hey Girl" peaked at number 26 on the US Hot Christian Songs chart.

Background
"Hey Girl" was released as the first promotional single from the album on March 4, 2022, concurrently launching the album's pre-order. The song impacted Christian radio in the United States on September 16, 2022, becoming the third single from the album. On September 23, 2022, Anne Wilson released a multi-track single of "Hey Girl" containing three new versions of the song.

Writing and development
Anne Wilson had an interview with Kevin Davis, lead contributor at NewReleaseToday about the song and the inspiration behind it. Davis asked about the personal story behind the song, to which Wilson responded, saying:

Critical reception
Jonathan Andre of 365 Days of Inspiring Media gave a positive review of "Hey Girl", describing it as "an anthem for girls everywhere as the track reminds each of us, especially girls, about who they are and their identity in Christ" and compared it to the song "Overwhelming Child of God" by Carman. Jesus Freak Hideout's Josh Balogh wrote a favourable review of the song, calling it "a playful earworm calling women to see themselves as God does."

Composition

Commercial performance
"Hey Girl" debuted at number 30 on the US Hot Christian Songs chart dated May 7, 2022.

"Hey Girl" made its debut at number 45 on the US Christian Airplay chart dated October 1, 2022.

Music videos
On March 3, 2022, Anne Wilson released the official lyric video for the song. On September 8, 2022, Anne Wilson released the official music video for "Hey Girl".

Track listing
All tracks were produced by Jeff Pardo except where stated.

Charts

Release history

References

External links
 

2022 singles
2022 songs
Anne Wilson songs
Songs written by Anne Wilson
Songs written by Jeff Pardo
Songs written by Matthew West
Sparrow Records singles